The 2020 Chama Cha Mapinduzi presidential primaries took place in July 2020. Incumbent president and 2015 nominee, John Magufuli ran unopposed for his second term for the President of Tanzania and so there was no primary vote for the Union presidency position. However, Zanzibar president Ali Mohamed Shein is ineligible for re-election due to term limits and a primary was held to determine the Zanzibar presidential nominee. The winners of the primary are the CCM candidates for the 2020 Tanzanian general election and the 2020 Zanzibari general election.

Background 
Presidential aspirants are required to submit their intent to run to the party by June 30th 2020. Each aspirant has to be able to collect 250 sponsors from 12 regions (including 2 from Zanzibar). The party secretariat convened in Dodoma in July to make their decisions. The candidates were vetted by the party congress and names of a select few will be submitted to the National Executive Committee of the party to select the candidate.

Union Presidential Candidates 
Incumbent president Dr John Magufuli and party chairman ran unopposed to get the party ticket for re-election. Former foreign minister of Tanzania Bernard Membe intended to collect party nomination forms to contest against the incumbent president, however, the CCM central committee expelled Membe from the party. Following the decision he returned his party card to leave the party.

Zanzibar Presidential Candidates 
The following candidates have been listed according to the dates that they expressed interest or formally announced their candidacy.

Declined to Run 

 Samia Suluhu, Vice-President of Tanzania, declined to run for the election ticket. citing that the move would be a demotion from her current title.

Results

Union Presidency 
Since John Magufuli ran unopposed, he was automatically nominated as the party's candidate as the nominee for the president of Tanzania.

Zanzibar Presidency

Central Committee 
On July 9, 2020 the central committee picked 5 names from the list of over 31 presidential aspirants. Of the 5, three names were passed down to the National Executive council for popular vote.

National Executive Council 
On July 10 2020, the National Executive council of the party voted on the 3 names passed down by the Central Committee. A total of 164 NEC members took part in the voting and Hussein Mwinyi won the party nomination by a landslide.

References 

Chama Cha Mapinduzi
Primary elections in Tanzania
2020 elections in Tanzania